The Garage is a live music and club venue in Highbury, North London. It opened in 1993 and has a capacity of 600. The upstairs room, also known as  the Grace, has a capacity of 150.

The venue has hosted a number of underplays, with the Killers, Jack White, Mumford & Sons Suede Sugababes and The 1975 being among some of the most recent acts to play the venue. Other acts who have passed through the doors include Green Day, Muse, Arctic Monkeys, Franz Ferdinand, [[Temples (band) Red Hot Chili Peppers, Paramore, Oasis and My Chemical Romance.

The Garage was originally a Temperance Billiard Hall which quickly gained a reputation for serving great pies,  as well as being a haunt for local villains in the sixties. The Highbury Mob often used the Billiard Hall as a meeting place. It became the London Town & Country Club 2, a sister venue to the Town and Country Club (now the Forum in Kentish Town), which is when the first live music events began to be programmed in the building.

In 1993, the building was officially reopened as the Garage with Pulp being the first big name to play the venue in May 1993. The venue was renamed the Garage by Mean Fiddler, after the Lex Garage which was once next door. In 2007 it was taken over by MAMA & Company. Jazz Cafe and Borderline were also included in the acquisition, incorporating them in to the MAMA Group's estate from August.

In June 2009, the Garage was relaunched as the Relentless Garage with joint naming rights with Relentless Energy Drinks.It was taken over by DHP Family in 2016. This led to a complete revamp of the whole venue in March 2017 to create an all day bar as well as an intimate 100 capacity venue, Thousand Island, upstairs. A new layout, bar, sound and lighting system for the Garage was also added.

The Garage has had acts such as Harry Styles, Jack White, Alt-J, Mystery Jets, Rina Sawayama, Jax Jones, Tory Lanez, the Rifles and War Child’s 25th anniversary shows in performance.

References

External links

Thousand Island on Facebook

1993 establishments in England
Buildings and structures in the London Borough of Islington
Music venues in London
Wrestling venues
Highbury